Brian Hogan (born 1981) is an Irish hurler.

Brian Hogan may also refer to:

Brian Hogan, Irish musician, member of Kíla
Brian Hogan (rugby league) (1947–2022), English rugby league footballer
Brian Hogan (Tipperary hurler) (born 1996), Irish hurler

See also 
Brian Cogan (born 1954), American judge
Brian Hagan, American artist